Dörgön Lake is a saltwater lake in Khovd, Mongolia. It is a part of the Great Lakes Depression, being one of the remnants of a prehistoric lake. It has a salinity of 4%.

References
Дөргөн нуур 

Lakes of Mongolia
Saline lakes of Asia